The 1968 United States presidential election in Kansas was held on November 5, 1968 as part of the 1968 United States presidential election. Richard Nixon won Kansas against both Hubert Humphrey and George Wallace. Nixon carried every county except traditionally Democratic Wyandotte.

Results

Results by county

See also
 United States presidential elections in Kansas

Notes

References

Kansas
1968 Kansas elections
1968